Ward 5 (Britannia Woods, Malton) is a municipal ward located in the northeast corner of the city of Mississauga, Ontario. Carolyn Parrish represents the ward's seat on Mississauga City Council and Peel Regional Council since her election in 2014.

The ward contains the communities of Malton, and the part of Hurontario (the community of Britannia) north of Eglinton Avenue.

Toronto Pearson International Airport is located within the ward.

Demographics
According to the Canada 2006 Census, the total population of the ward was 75,415.

The largest ethnic group in the ward is South Asians who make up 39.3% of the population (primarily East Indians). 28% of the population is White, 11.4% Black, 6.2% Chinese, 3.3% Filipino, 3.3% Southeast Asian, 1.8% Latin American, and 1.7% Arab. The ward has the highest percentage of visible minorities in the city.

English is the largest mother tongue in the ward, with 40.4% of the ward speaking it as their native language. Punjabi is spoken by 16.5% of the ward.

The median individual income of the ward is $23,141.

Election results

1994

1997

2000

2003

Two time councillor Cliff Gyles was defeated in the election by Eve Adams; the incumbent placed a distant sixth. The election was held November 10, roughly two months after Gyles was sentenced to 2.5 years in federal penitentiary for accepting $35,000 in bribes.

2006

2010

2011 by-election

2014

2018

2022

References

External links
 
Ward 5 Census Profile 
1994 results 
1997 results 
2000 results
2003 results 
2006 results 
2010 results
2011 by-election results
2014 results

Politics of Mississauga
Municipal electoral districts of Canada